Decimus Terentius Gentianus was a Roman senator of the 2nd century AD who held a number of offices in the imperial service, as well as gentianus with Lucius Co[...] as his colleague. His origins may be in Gallia Narbonensis, and Gentianus may have been the son of Decimus Terentius Scaurianus, one of Trajan's generals.

Life and career 
Gentianus' cursus honorum is known in frustratingly incomplete detail from a fragmentary inscription in Sarmizegetusa. Prior to acceding to the consulate, Gentianus held the usual posts of military tribune, quaestor, plebeian tribune, praetor, then governor of an imperial province; however, the portions of the inscription which identifies which legion he was tribune of and the name of the province he governed are both missing.

However the inscription from Sarmizegetusa attests Gentianus was admitted to the College of Pontiffs. He also supervised the census of the public province of Macedonia.

More information is available about his death. According to the Historia Augusta, during the reign of Hadrian, Gentianus had become highly esteemed by his fellow Senators. In spite of this, or because of it, towards the end of his reign Hadrian came to dislike him, although the emperor had considered making Gentianus his successor. The Historia Augusta strongly implies that Terentius Gentianus was one of many put to death "either openly or by craft".

There is evidence that he may have traveled to Roman Egypt: in the 14th century was seen the first six lines of a poem inscribed on one of the Pyramids of Giza, addressed to "a most sweet brother" named "Decimus Gentianus". Hermann Dessau, and others after him, identify that person with this Gentianus.

Terentia Inscription 
The referral to Gentianus on a bygone Latin inscription on the Great Pyramid of Khufu at Giza, immortalised in 1335 by a German pilgrim, Wilhelm von Boldensele, is widely agreed to have been carved (or likely dictated) by his sister Terentia, who visited Egypt some time after AD 130 after the Emperor Hadrian's tour of the country, after which Gentianus had died.

The poem read:
I have seen the pyramids, but without you, sweetest brother;
and I have poured out what offering I could — my tears of sorrow. 
I incise this lament, too; it carries the memory of our anguish. 
Thus on a lofty pyramid there may survive the name 
of Decimus Gentianus: priest; companion, Trajan, 
at your triumphs; censor, too, and consul, all inside a thirty-year span.

Vidi pyramidas sine te, dulcissime frater,
et tibi, quod potui, lacrimas hic maesta profudi,
et nostri memorem luctus hanc sculpo querelam.
Si<c> nomen Decimi <G>entia<n>i pyramide alta, pontiÀcis comitisque tuis, Traiane, triumphis,
lustra<que> sex intra censoris, consulis, e<x>s<t>e<t>.
(CIL 3.21 and 6625 = ILS 1046A = CLE 270)

Though the poem is that of an amateur, Terentia falls into a tradition of Greek and Roman visitors carving inscriptions, sometimes of an epigrammatic nature, onto Egyptian monuments as part of their travels, such as those carved by the likewise learned Roman female visitors Julia Balbilla and Caecilia Trebulla on the Colossi of Memnon in Thebes. Terentia's emotional lament in memory of her deceased brother reflects on the success of his career and is thus a sign of her pietas (piety) to him. Moreover, it is revealing of her erudition as a Roman elite woman. Her wish that her brother could have witnessed the pyramids as she had is a conventional theme found in Greco-Roman tourists' visits to Egyptian monuments, and her style bears witness to her education and culture, containing allusions to the famed verses of Horace, Ovid and, perhaps, Catullus.

References 

2nd-century Romans
2nd-century deaths
Suffect consuls of Imperial Rome
Gentianus, Decimus
Great Pyramid of Giza